The Chooz Nuclear Power Station lies in the municipality of Chooz in the Ardennes department, France, on the Meuse River in a panhandle protruding into Belgium, between the French city of Charleville-Mézières and the Belgian municipality of Dinant, near the comune of Givet.

Three nuclear reactors have been built on the site, Chooz A, Chooz B1 and Chooz B2. Chooz A was permanently shutdown in 1991 and is still undergoing the decommissioning process since 2007.

As of 2022, the plant employed around 1200 operators.

The Chooz reactors were a source of neutrinos for the Chooz neutrino oscillation experiment; a new experiment, Double Chooz, was also operating nearby.

Chooz A 
Chooz A was an early pressurized water reactor (PWR) design by Westinghouse, built and operated by French (EDF) and Belgian (SENA) grid operators. It was shut down in 1991 after an operational life of 22 years. The containment building of this unit was underground. 

Decommissioning was authorised in 2007. After preliminary work, decommissioning of the reactor pressure vessel began in 2016. As of 2022, vessel’s internal equipment was being dismantled under water.

Chooz B1 and B2 
Two units of the N4 reactor design are currently in operation, Chooz B1 and Chooz B2. Designed for a net power output of 1450 MWe, power was uprated to 1500 MWe in 2003. This was the highest nameplate capacity for any reactor design worldwide until the Taishan Nuclear Power Plant in China began operation. The Taishan plant is an EPR design reactor with a net power output of greater than 1,600 MWe per reactor.

Reactors

References

External links

Chooz B, Nuclear Engineering International wall chart, February 1985

Nuclear power stations in France
Buildings and structures in Ardennes (department)